Chaitali may refer to:

 Chaitali (poetry collection), a late 19th-century collection of poems by Rabindranath Tagore
 Chaitali (film), a 1975 Hindi film directed by Hrishikesh Mukherjee
 Chaitali Chakrabarti (active 2012), electrical engineer